Clifford Trent Robinson (born March 13, 1960) is an American former professional basketball player.

Professional career
A University of Southern California alumnus, Robinson was drafted into the National Basketball Association by New Jersey Nets in 1979 with the 11th overall pick in the 1979 NBA draft.  Cliff was the youngest player in the NBA two years running.  He gave the Nets a solid rookie season, averaging 13.6 points and 7.2 rebounds per game. His  45 points against Detroit on March 9, 1980, are the most ever scored in an NBA game by a teenager.

On June 8, 1981, Robinson was traded  to Kansas City for Otis Birdsong. Robinson would average a career best 20.2 points in 38 games for the Kings, before being traded to the Cleveland Cavaliers. In perhaps his best game as a Cavalier, on April 15, 1983, Robinson scored 40 points and grabbed 8 rebounds in a 132–124 victory over the Indiana Pacers.

From 1979 to 1989, he steadily maintained his scoring average between roughly 18 and 20 points per game, despite playing for several teams. His best season (1985–86) came in a Washington Bullets uniform, as he achieved a career-high season total of 1,460 points in 78 games played, and shot a career-best 76.2% from the free throw line. On December 12, 1985, Robinson scored 21 points and hit a game-winning jump shot with only 1 second left in overtime to beat the Milwaukee Bucks by a margin of 110-108. That postseason, Robinson averaged 21.4 points, 8.6 rebounds, 3.4 assists, and 2 steals in a hard fought 3-2 series loss to the Philadelphia 76ers in the first round.

In 1986, he and Jeff Ruland were traded to the Philadelphia 76ers for NBA legend Moses Malone. Robinson left the NBA in 1989, but later signed with the Los Angeles Lakers for the 1991–92 NBA season. He finished his career averaging 17.2 points, 8.3 rebounds and 2.0 assists per game.

References

External links
nba.com/historical/playerfile
Clifford Trent Robinson at Basketball-Reference.com

1960 births
Living people
20th-century African-American sportspeople
21st-century African-American people
African-American basketball players
American expatriate basketball people in Greece
American men's basketball players
Basketball players from Oakland, California
Cleveland Cavaliers players
Kansas City Kings players
Los Angeles Lakers players
Milon B.C. players
New Jersey Nets draft picks
New Jersey Nets players
Philadelphia 76ers players
Rapid City Thrillers players
Small forwards
United States Basketball League players
USC Trojans men's basketball players
Washington Bullets players